Valeska or Valeška may refer to the following people:

Given name 
Valeska von Gallwitz (1833–1888), German writer
Valeska Gert (1892–c. 1978), German dancer and cabaret artist
Valeska Menezes (born 1976), Brazilian volleyball player
Valeska Röver (1849–1931), German painter
Valeska Saab (born 1984), Ecuadorian politician, charity worker, model and beauty pageant titleholder
Valeska Sandoval, Nicaraguan student 
 Valeska Steiner (born 1986), Swiss singer and member of the duo Boy
Valeska Stock (1887–1966), German actress
Valeska Suratt (1882–1962), American stage and silent film actress
Sina-Valeska Jung (born 1979), German actress

Surname 
Adolfas Valeška (1905–1994), Lithuanian stained glass artist, painter and stage designer
Lette Valeska (1885–1985), American photographer, painter and sculptor

Fictional characters 
Jerome and Jeremiah Valeska, recurring characters in Gotham

See also 
 610 Valeska, a main-belt asteroid
 Saved by the Belle, a Three Stooges short that takes place in the fictional country of Valeska.

Slavic-language surnames